Artichoke Italian latent virus is a virus that infects plants. It consists of two segments of positive-sense, single-stranded RNA enclosed in an icosahedral capsid. Artichoke Italian latent virus can infect a variety of flowering plants, causing discoloration and growth stunting.

See also 
 List of grape diseases

References

External links 
 Family Groups—The Baltimore Method

Nepoviruses
Viral grape diseases